Taqlid (Arabic تَقْليد taqlīd) is an Islamic term denoting the conformity of one person to the teaching of another. The person who performs taqlid is termed muqallid. The definite meaning of the term varies depending on context and age. Classical usage of the term differs between Sunni Islam and Shia Islam. Sunni Islamic usage designates the unjustified conformity of one person to the teaching of another, rather than the justified conformity of a layperson to the teaching of mujtahid (a person who is qualified for independent reasoning). Shia Islamic usage designates the general conformity of non-mujtahid to the teaching of mujtahid, and there is no negative connotation. The discrepancy corresponds to differing views on Shia views on the Imamate and Sunni imams. 

In contemporary usage, especially in the context of Islamic reformism, it is often portrayed in a negative light and translated as "blind imitation". This refers to the perceived stagnation of independent intellectual effort (ijtihad) and uncritical imitation of traditional religious interpretation by the religious establishment in general.

Overview
The Arabic word taqlīd is derived from the three-letter Arabic verbal root of  Q-L-D , which means to imitate. The term is believed to have originated from the idea of allowing oneself to be led "by the collar". One who performs taqlid is called a muqallid, whereas one who rejects taqlid is called a ghair-muqallid. Sheikh Shaamee Hanafi said it is "to take the statement of someone without knowing the evidence."

Sunni Islam 
Traditionally, taqlid is lawful and obligatory when one is not qualified as a mujtahid. According to Rudolph Peters, this is by consensus and known in the religion by necessity (ma'lum min al din daruratan) in the eyes of traditional Muslim scholars.

Traditional Sunni scholars rely on two verses of the Qur'an that order one to ask the people of knowledge or remembrance if they do not know and to obey Allah, the messenger and those in authority among them. They also rely on several hadiths, including one where Muhammad tells his companions, "If one does not know what to do, the only remedy is to inquire." Muhammad did this after a companion who had fractured his skull asked other companions with him whether he could perform dry purification. They said no. So this injured companion washed his head with water and died. Muhammad admonished his companions by saying, "They killed him. May Allah kill them. If one does not know what to do, the only remedy is to inquire."

Wahhabi, Salafi and Ahl-i Hadith schools of tradition reject taqlid and instead encourage ijtihad.

Shia Islam 
In Shia Islam, taqlid "denotes the following or "imitating" of the dictates of a mujtahid".  Following the greater occultation (al-ghaybatu 'l-kubra) in 941 CE (329 AH), the Twelver Shia  are obliged to observe taqlid in their religious affairs by following the teachings of a thinker (mujtahid) or jurist (faqih). As of the 19th century the Shia ulama taught believers to turn to "a source of taqlid" (marja' at-taqlid) "for advice and guidance and as a model to be imitated."
Thus Shia who are not experts in Islamic jurisprudence (fiqh) are "legally required to follow the instructions of the expert, i.e., the mujtahid" in matters of sharia, but are forbidden to do so in "matters of belief" (usulu 'd-din). 

In "matters of belief", aka "principles of religion" -- such as  the existence of God and prophethood -- tahqiq, rather than taqlid, should be used.  Tahqiq means seeking the truth,  investigating or doing research yourself,  rather than following an expert.

See also
 Case law
Madhhab

References

Arabic words and phrases in Sharia
Islamic terminology
Shia theology
Islamic jurisprudence